Yancarlos Martínez Martínez (born 8 July 1992) is a Dominican Republic sprinter. He competed in the 100 and 200 metres at the 2015 World Championships in Beijing reaching the semifinals in the second event. Initially he practiced baseball, and only switched to athletics after injuring his wrist in 2013.

He competed at the 2020 Summer Olympics.

International competitions

Personal bests
Outdoor
100 metres – 10.14 (+1.9 m/s, Toronto 2015)
200 metres – 20.17 (-0.4 m/s, Tokyo 2021)
Indoor
60 metres – 6.78 (New York 2016)

References

External links

1992 births
Living people
Dominican Republic male sprinters
World Athletics Championships athletes for the Dominican Republic
Place of birth missing (living people)
Athletes (track and field) at the 2015 Pan American Games
Athletes (track and field) at the 2016 Summer Olympics
Olympic athletes of the Dominican Republic
Central American and Caribbean Games silver medalists for the Dominican Republic
Competitors at the 2014 Central American and Caribbean Games
Competitors at the 2018 Central American and Caribbean Games
Athletes (track and field) at the 2019 Pan American Games
Pan American Games bronze medalists for the Dominican Republic
Pan American Games medalists in athletics (track and field)
Central American and Caribbean Games medalists in athletics
Medalists at the 2019 Pan American Games
Athletes (track and field) at the 2020 Summer Olympics
20th-century Dominican Republic people
21st-century Dominican Republic people